Kalabsh (Handcuff) is a 2017 Egyptian drama and suspense TV-Series directed by Peter Mimy and starring Amir Karara in the role of Sleim El-Ansary, a most confident and honest policeman. The series is based on a story written by Yousef Hasan Yousef, then dramatized and scripted by Baher Dewidar.

A sequel was released in 2018, and it is assumed that a third season will be broadcast during Ramadan 2019.. A third season was released in 2019

Production 
Director Mohamed Bakeer was supposed to direct the show, but that didn't happen due to disagreements with producer Muhammed Abdel Hamid, which led to assigning young director Peter Mimy to direct Klabash 1, 2 and working on the third season. Mimy is known with his style mimicking Hollywood crime flicks and working with western artists

Overview 
Mimy, Karara and others stated that the production team got big help from Egyptian police ministry on the two seasons of the series, also more logistic and influencing cooperation, to deliver a good message of the honest police man who fights for the right, and also other re-accruing problems that affects Egypt at this particular period, such as Islamic militias, however, the director stated that there was no interference by them in the show.

Cast  

 Amir Karara: Sleim El-Ansary
 Mohamed Lotfy: Ibrahim El-Sunni
 Reem Mostafa: Farida
 Eslam Hafez: Tamer Lutfi Abu El-Majd
 Diab: Zanati El-Sayyed Zeynhom
 Ahmed Seyam: Lutfi Abu El-Majd
 Mohsen Mansour: Mahmoud Abd El-Moneim (Houda Saitara)
 Tarek El Nahry: Nashaat Fahmy
 Mahmoud El Bezawy: Salah El-Tokhi
 Mahmoud Hegazy: Ziad
 Mohamed Marzaban: Hammad
Sara Elshamy: Salma El-Ansari
 Mohamed Ezz: Attia Azzam
Omar El Shenawy:Hossam

See also 
 Kalabsh 2

Resources 

Egyptian television series
Arabic television series
Egyptian drama television series
Capital Broadcasting Center original programming